Breslow may refer to:

Bruce Breslow (born 1956), American businessman and politician
Craig Breslow (born 1980), American Major League Baseball pitcher
Jan Breslow (born 1943), American physician and medical researcher
Lester Breslow (1915–2012), American physician and public health specialist
Lou Breslow (1900–1987), American screenwriter and film director
Marc Breslow (1925–2015), American television director
Norman Breslow (1941–2015), American statistician and medical researcher
Ronald Breslow (1931–2017), American chemist

See also
Breslow's depth, prognostic factor in melanoma of the skin